Tanner Hall is a 2009 drama  film about four girls coming of age in boarding school. It was written and directed by Tatiana von Fürstenberg and Francesca Gregorini. It stars Rooney Mara, Georgia King, Brie Larson, Amy Ferguson, Tom Everett Scott, and Amy Sedaris.

The film had its world premiere at the Toronto International Film Festival on September 14, 2009, before being released on September 9, 2011, by Anchor Bay Films.

Plot
As Fernanda enters her senior year at Tanner Hall—a sheltered boarding school in New England—she is faced with unexpected changes in her group of friends when a childhood acquaintance, the charismatic yet manipulative trouble-maker Victoria, appears. Shy and studious, Fernanda is usually the voice of reason among her friends—adventurous and sexy Kate and tomboy Lucasta. Jealous of Fernanda's exciting relationship, Victoria begins to sabotage Fernanda's plans and plots to publicly humiliate her.

Cast

Release
It was the first feature film for von Fürstenberg and Gregorini that had its world premiere as an Official Selection at the Toronto International Film Festival in September 2009. It was well received at the Hamptons International Film Festival and was awarded the Grand Jury Prize for Best Feature at the Gen Art Film Festival. It was picked up by Anchor Bay Films, a division of Anchor Bay Entertainment, and was released in theaters September 2011. It was later released on Blu-ray and DVD on December 13, 2011. The extras contained audio commentaries of the directors and a trailer of the film.

Reception

Critical response
Rotten Tomatoes gave the film a 12% score  with critics (two of the seventeen reviews being positive) and 27% score with audiences, a "Rotten" rating for both. Aggregate review site Metacritic scored it 40 out of 100 from 10 reviews, indicating mixed or average.

Awards and nominations

References

 http://www.newschoolers.com/index.html
 https://web.archive.org/web/20100902141806/http://www.if3.ca/if3/likealion2010

External links
 
 

2009 films
2009 drama films
Films set in boarding schools
Films scored by Roger Neill
2000s English-language films